Dark Matter is an anthology series of science fiction, fantasy, and horror stories and essays produced by people of African descent. The editor of the series is Sheree Thomas. The first book in the series, Dark Matter: A Century of Speculative Fiction from the African Diaspora (2000), won the 2001 World Fantasy Award for Best Anthology. The second book in the Dark Matter series, Dark Matter: Reading the Bones (2004), won the World Fantasy Award for Best Anthology in 2005. A forthcoming third book in the series is tentatively named Dark Matter: Africa Rising. This was finally published at the end of 2022 under the title Africa Risen: A New Era of Speculative Fiction, from Tor Books.

In the introduction to the first book, the editor explains that the title alludes to cosmological "dark matter", an invisible yet essential part of the universe, to highlight how black people's contributions have been ignored: "They became dark matter, invisible to the naked eye; and yet their influence — their gravitational pull on the world around them — would become undeniable".

Book I contents

Stories
Samuel R. Delany, "Aye, and Gomorrah..."
Octavia E. Butler, "The Evening and the Morning and the Night"
Charles R. Saunders, "Gimmile's Songs"
Steven Barnes, "The Woman in the Wall"
Tananarive Due, "Like Daughter"
Jewelle Gomez, "Chicago 1927"
George S. Schuyler, "Black No More" (excerpt from the novel)
Ishmael Reed, "Future Christmas" (novel excerpt)
Kalamu ya Salaam, "Can You Wear My Eyes"
Robert Fleming, "The Astral Visitor Delta Blues"
Nalo Hopkinson, "Ganger (Ball Lightning)"
W. E. B. Du Bois, "The Comet"
Linda Addison, "Twice, at Once, Separated"
Honorée Fanonne Jeffers, "Sister Lilith"
Evie Shockley, "separation anxiety"
Leone Ross, "Tasting Songs"
Nalo Hopkinson, "Greedy Choke Puppy"
Amiri Baraka, "Rhythm Travel"
Kalamu ya Salaam, "Buddy Bolden"
Akua Lezli Hope, "The Becoming"
Charles W. Chesnutt, "The Goophered Grapevine"
Nisi Shawl, "At the Huts of Ajala"
Henry Dumas, "Ark of Bones"
Tony Medina, "Butta's Backyard Barbecue"
Kiini Ibura Salaam, "At Life's Limits"
Anthony Joseph, "The African Origins of UFOs" (excerpt from the novel)
Derrick Bell, "The Space Traders"
Darryl A. Smith, "The Pretended"
Ama Patterson, "Hussy Strutt"

Essays
Samuel R. Delany, "Racism and Science Fiction"
Charles R. Saunders, "Why Blacks Should Read (and Write) Science Fiction"
Walter Mosley, "Black to the Future"
Paul D. Miller, a.k.a. DJ Spooky That Subliminal Kid, "Yet Do I Wonder"
Octavia E. Butler, "The Monophobic Response"

Reviews
The New York Times Review by Gerald Jonas (2000)
Scifi.com Review by Joe Monti, Issue 167 (July 2000)
 MAKING BOOKS; Science Fiction, A Black Natural by Martin Arnold, New York Times (2000)
Steven Silver's Review
African American Review by Candice M. Jenkins (Winter 2000)
Locus Magazine Review by Gary K. Wolfe (July 2000)
Locus Magazine Review by Faren Miller (June 2000)
Washington Science Fiction Association (WSFA) Journal Review by Colleen R. Cahill (November 2001)
Science Fiction Studies at DePauw University Review by Isiah Lavender III (March 2001)
SF Site Featured Review by Greg L. Johnson (2001)
A.V. Club Review by Tasha Robinson (2002)

Awards
2001 World Fantasy Award for Best Anthology
2005 World Fantasy Award for Best Anthology
2000 New York Times Notable Book of the Year
Best SF and Fantasy Books of 2000: Editors' Choice, Honourable Mention

Book II contents

Stories
Ihsan Bracy, "ibo landing"
Cherene Sherrard, "The Quality of Sand"
Charles R. Saunders, "Yahimba's Choice"
Nalo Hopkinson, "The Glass Bottle Trick"
Kiini Ibura Salaam, "Desire"
David Findlay, "Recovery from a Fall"
Douglas Kearney, "Anansi Meets Peter Parker at the Taco Bell on Lexington"
Nnedi Okorafor-Mbachu, "The Magical Negro"
W. E. B. Du Bois, "Jesus Christ in Texas"
Henry Dumas, "Will the Circle Be Unbroken?"	
Kevin Brockenbrough, "'Cause Harlem Needs Heroes"
Pam Noles, "Whipping Boy"
Ibi Aanu Zoboi, "Old Flesh Song"
Walter Mosley, "Whispers in the Dark"
Tananarive Due, "Aftermoon"
Tyehimba Jess, "Voodoo Vincent and the Astrostoriograms"
John S. Cooley, "The Binary"
Jill Robinson, "BLACKout"
Charles Johnson, "Sweet Dreams"
Wanda Coleman, "Buying Primo Time"
Samuel R. Delany, "Corona"
Nisi Shawl, "Maggies"
Andrea Hairston, "Mindscape" (novel excerpt)
Kalamu ya Salaam, "Trance"

Essays
Jewelle Gomez, "The Second Law of Thermodynamics"
Nnedi Okorafor-Mbachu, "Her Pen Could Fly: Remembering Virginia Hamilton"
Carol Cooper, "Celebrating the Alien: The Politics of Race and Species in the Juveniles of Andre Norton"

Reviews
Locus Magazine Review by Gary K. Wolfe (November 2003)
Locus Magazine Review by Faren Miller (December 2003)
SF Site Featured Review by Steven H Silver (2004)
Scifi.com Review by Pamela Sargent, Issue 354 (2004)
ChickenBones Literary Journal Review
BookLoons Review by Martina Bexte (2004)
Curled Up With a Good Book Review by Brian Charles Clark  (2004)
Austin Chronicle Review by Belinda Acosta (2005)

Awards
2005 World Fantasy Award for Best Anthology

See also

Africanfuturism
Afrofuturism
Black science fiction
Africa Risen: A New Era of Speculative Fiction
Nisi Shawl
Samuel R. Delany

External links
Official Website of Sheree Renée Thomas
Sheree Thomas' Author Page on AALBC
Black Science Fiction and Fantasy on NPR (audio)
Publishers Weekly Starred Review
Book Page for "Dark Matter: A Century of Speculative Fiction from the African Diaspora" on Grand Central Publishing Group USA
Book Page for "Dark Matter: Reading the Bones" on Grand Central Publishing Group USA
Book Page for Dark Matter: A Century of Speculative Fiction from the African Diaspora on Hachette Book Group USA
Book Page for Dark Matter: Reading the Bones on Hachette Book Group USA
The Carl Brandon Society, A Community of Speculative Fiction Writers of Color
Charles R. Saunders Interview by Amy Harlib on ScifiDimensions
Nisi Shawl
Samuel R. Delany
Dark Matter Africa Risen

Science fiction anthologies
Fantasy anthologies
Horror anthologies
2000 anthologies
African diaspora literature
African-American literature
Afrofuturism